The 2004 Bavaria World Darts Trophy was the third edition of the World Darts Trophy, a professional darts tournament held at the De Vechtsebanen in Utrecht, the Netherlands, run by the British Darts Organisation and the World Darts Federation.

The 2003 winner, Raymond van Barneveld retained the trophy beating Martin Adams in the final of the men's event, 6–4 in sets. Andy Fordham. the BDO World Champion, was absent from the field this year in the men's event. 
In the women's event, the 2003 winner and the BDO World Champion, Trina Gulliver lost at the quarter-final stage to Anastasia Dobromyslova. Dobromyslova was then beaten by Francis Hoenselaar, last year's finalist, 3–1 in sets in the final.

Seeds

Men
  Raymond van Barneveld
  Mervyn King
  Tony West
  Ted Hankey
  Tony David
  Gary Anderson
  Tony O'Shea
  Darryl Fitton

Prize money

Men

Men's tournament

Women's tournament

References 

World Darts Trophy
World Darts Trophy
2004 in Dutch sport